Qinhua Circuit (Chinese: t , s , p Qīnhuàdào) was a military governor–level circuit of China during the Tang dynasty. Its capital was Tanzhou (modern Changsha).

History
Qinhua Circuit was a promotion of the earlier Hunan Circuit for Min Xu. Following his death and its expansion, it was later renamed the Wu'an Circuit.

See also
 Tang dynasty
 History of the administrative divisions of China

Tang dynasty